Tyler State Park can refer to either of two state parks in the United States:

Tyler State Park (Pennsylvania)
Tyler State Park (Texas)

See also
 Tyler Park (disambiguation)